Qaleh-ye Bala-ye Sian (also Romanized as Qal‘eh-ye Bālā-ye Sīān; also known as Qal‘ehbālā, Qal‘eh-e Bālā, and Qal‘eh-ye Bālā) is a village in Emamzadeh Abdol Aziz Rural District, Jolgeh District, Isfahan County, Isfahan Province, Iran. At the 2006 census, its population was 340, in 79 families.

References 

Populated places in Isfahan County